Chydaeopsis luzonica is a species of beetle in the family Cerambycidae. It was described by Heller in 1923.

References

Acanthocinini
Beetles described in 1923